Beysheke is a village in the Kemin District of Chüy Region of Kyrgyzstan. Its population was 1,268 in 2021.

References

Populated places in Chüy Region